Zelanophilus is a genus of three species of centipedes, in the family Zelanophilidae. It was described by American biologist Ralph Vary Chamberlin in 1920.

Species
Valid species:
 Zelanophilus kapiti Archey, 1922
 Zelanophilus pococki Crabill, 1963
 Zelanophilus provocator (Pocock, 1891)

References

 

 
 
Centipede genera
Animals described in 1920
Taxa named by Ralph Vary Chamberlin